Inula auriculata may refer to three different species of plants:
 Inula auriculata Wall., a synonym for Vicoa indica (L.) DC.
 Inula auriculata Boiss. & Balansa, a synonym for Pentanema auriculatum (Boiss. & Balansa) D.Gut.Larr. et al.
 Inula auriculata Schur, a synonym for Pentanema salicinum (L.) D.Gut.Larr. et al.